"Methought I Saw my Late Espoused Saint" is the first line of a sonnet by the English poet John Milton, typically designated as Sonnet XXIII and thus referred to by scholars. The poem recounts a dream vision in which the speaker saw his wife return to him (as the dead Alcestis appeared to her husband Admetus), only to see her disappear again as day comes. There is considerable discussion among scholars as to which of his first two wives Milton could refer to. Samuel Johnson, in the Lives of the Most Eminent English Poets, suggests his second wife, Katherine Woodcock, and comments that "her husband honoured her memory with a poor sonnet".

Content
The influence of Giovanni della Casa's sonnets is recognized as an influence on all of Milton's sonnets; critics discern della Casa's "deliberate [break] with the Petrarchan tradition of regularity and smoothness". Sonnet XXIII combines two traditions, with its argument developing in the way of the English sonnet (in quatrains and a couplet) while its rhyme scheme follows the Italian form. The poem drives much of its strength from the opposition of day and night, made explicit in the last line (the pairing is discussed by Leo Spitzer in comparison with a Latin poem by Iovianus Pontanus).

Structure and meaning
Leo Spitzer in 1951 was one of the first to suggest a tripartite structure, subsequently agreed upon and expanded by other critics: the imagery in the sonnet moves from Greek history and mythology (the reference to Alcestis) through Jewish law (the purification mandated by the "old Law"), to Christian salvation, one critic describing the movement as "a progressive definition of salvation". According to John Spencer Hill, this particular structure is typical of Milton's later writings: he sees it in Books IV and V (Proserpine-Eve-Mary) and Books XI and XII (Deucalion-Noah-Christ) of Paradise Lost, and in Samson Agonistes (Hercules-Samson-Christ): the triptychs, whose figures are taken successively, do not just complement each other; cumulatively they present an organic process toward spiritual fulfillment in the antitype.

References

Notes

Bibliography

Johnson, Samuel. Lives of the Most Eminent English Poets. London: Dove, 1826. Two vols.

Poetry by John Milton
Sonnets